Kizhanatham is a village near Palayamkottai in Tirunelveli district of Tamil Nadu India.

The Pincode of Kizhanatham is 627353.

It consist of two parts Vellakovil and kizhanatham. Kizhanatham as it now stands has a very old temple dedicated to Sri Venugopalaswamy with his consorts Rukmini and Satyabhama. Unlike other Venugopalaswamy shrines, the presiding deity has his head tilted backwards, in a fully absorbed mode of flute rendition which is not seen elsewhere.

There are many famous personalities from this small hamlet, notable among them are industrialist Sri N Krishnan ("Yenkay"), Rao Bahadur Kizhanatham Anantanarayanan Krishna Aiyangar (Rao Bahadur K A Krishna Aiyangar) of Alleppey who was a very famous lawyer of the early 1900s. Alleppey Krishna Aiyangar is the founder of the famous Sanathana Dharma Vidyala (SDV) Schools (1906).

External links
 Detailed particulars of the village and its history
 SDV College
 

Villages in Tirunelveli district